NGC 472 is a spiral galaxy located roughly 220 million lightyears from earth in the constellation Pisces. It was discovered on August 29, 1862 by Heinrich Louis d'Arrest.

See also 
 List of galaxies
 List of spiral galaxies

References

External links 
 
 Deep Sky Catalog
 SEDS

0472
18620829
Pisces (constellation)
Spiral galaxies
Discoveries by Heinrich Louis d'Arrest
004833